Flintville is an unincorporated community in Lincoln County, Tennessee, United States. As of the 2010 census, its population was 627.

Demographics

For statistical purposes, the United States Census Bureau has defined this community as a census-designated place (CDP).

Government
Flintville has a post office with ZIP code 37335, which opened on February 16, 1861.

References

Census-designated places in Lincoln County, Tennessee
Unincorporated communities in Tennessee
Census-designated places in Tennessee
Unincorporated communities in Lincoln County, Tennessee
1861 establishments in Tennessee